Do Not Believe His Lies was a 2014 puzzle mobile app game designed by Polish designer Lukasz Matablewski. Matablewski released the app to the iTunes storefront on July 10, 2014 and since its release, the game has developed a Reddit following. According to the official website as of March 20, 2015, eight players have completed the game and over 275,000 people are participating in Do Not Believe His Lies. 

In 2018, the game's website and its database were removed by the developer, effectively shutting down the game, and have not been restored ever since.

Gameplay
Gameplay is centered on the player solving a series of puzzles and riddles. After successfully completing each puzzle the player is presented with words that, upon completing the game, tells a story. The puzzles grow more and more complex as the player continues to solve puzzles and some require the player to utilize various mobile device features.

Reception
Reception for the game prior to its completion has been positive. TUAW complimented the storytelling aspect of the game, writing that "A fascinating part of the game and what makes it rather enjoyable is that each code seems to form a kind of story." Kotaku gave a more mixed review due to the app charging for puzzle hints, writing "I do understand that the developer needs to make money off this game somehow, but it's hard not to walk away with the sense that it was deliberately made difficult to try to squeeze as much money away from people as possible. Maybe that's just me being cynical. And maybe it doesn't matter in the end—the game is pretty damn good."

References

External links

Reddit thread on Do Not Believe His Lies

Android (operating system) games
IOS games
2014 video games
Puzzle video games
Video games developed in Poland